Edith Branson (1891–1976) was an American painter who was known for her use of color to convey emotions. Her mature work included stylized figures and natural subjects as well as complete abstractions. She was intensely committed to her craft but made little effort to show in commercial galleries or sell her paintings by other means. Although her work appeared mostly in extremely large group exhibitions, it was nonetheless frequently singled out for comment in the local press.

Early life and training

Branson was raised in Athens, Georgia where her father was head of the State Normal School. Having married in 1914, she and her husband moved to Manhattan in 1916. She did not enroll in an art school but studied informally with Charles J. Martin, A. S. Baylinson, and Kenneth Hayes Miller. She also gave close observation of classical Indian and Chinese art in collections of the Metropolitan Museum of Art and made sketches in a stylized abstraction from them.

Career in art

Branson rented a studio in the Lincoln Arcade Building at Broadway and 65th Street near Lincoln Square. She  became acquainted with other artists who had studios there including Robert Henri, George Bellows, Ralph Barton, Raphael Soyer and, in particular, members of the Society of Independent Artists who had founded the organization in one of the building's studios in 1916. They were Walter Arensberg, John Covert, Marcel Duchamp, Katherine Sophie Dreier, William J. Glackens, Albert Gleizes, John Marin, Walter Pach, Man Ray, Mary Rogers (artist), John Sloan and Joseph Stella. Long afterwards, she said about that time: "Those were exciting days. We were all outcasts, more or less." She shared the studio with other artists, but paid the full rent herself because, as she saw matters, her husband's income allowed her to afford the cost whereas they, without financial support, could not afford it. In 1921 she began a practice that was to continue over the next 20 years of exhibiting her work in the society's annual shows. In 1934 she joined the board of directors of the society, a post that she continued to hold until 1940.

The annual exhibitions were enormous. On paying a small fee any artist could display work in them and each year hundreds of them did so. The range of quality as of artistic style was extremely broad. Between its first exhibition in 1917 and its last in 1944 the society attracted participation from nearly 7,000 artists coming from the whole of the United States and many other countries. Although many of these artists failed to establish reputations in the New York art world, many others achieved professional success. In addition to Branson, notable women artists who showed at annual exhibitions included Mary E. Hutchinson, Marguerite Zorach, Ann Brockman, Agnes Weinrich, Katherine Dreier, Mary Rogers, Adelaide Lawson, and Theresa Bernstein.

Branson's paintings had been singled out for comment during the society's exhibitions in 1930 and 1932 and in 1935 they drew more substantial critical attention when she showed in a solo exhibition at New York's Contemporary Arts Gallery. In 1930 Marion Clyde McCarroll, a critic for the New York Post, set a mildly humorous tone for subsequent reviews by making fun of the vague titles she supplied for the two abstractions she submitted. In 1932 the Brooklyn Daily Eagle'''s William Weer chided of Branson for calling an abstraction "very conservative," and Edward Alden Jewell of the New York Times said the same painting was "simply ornamental disintegration." When her paintings appeared at Contemporary Arts in 1935 a critic for the New York Sun complained about vague titles and took issue with her assertion that they conveyed emotion using color in the way that music conveyed emotion. The Post'' critic felt the same about the analogy between sound and color but said, nonetheless, that she handled color well. That praise was something she was unaccustomed to receiving. Simply being noticed was an achievement for a woman abstractionist at that time. Critics reacted to Branson's paintings because, as one said, their effect was striking. The ability of her paintings to stand out from the hundreds of others on show in the society's exhibitions most likely came from their quality as works of art rather than any efforts on her part to promote them.

In 1935 Branson's painting, "Orchestration," was selected for an exhibition called Abstract Painting in America, held at the Whitney Museum of American Art. A general survey of abstractionism over two decades, the show contained more than 100 works by 65 artists, five of whom were women. Later that year her painting "Dawn" was selected for the 14th Annual Corcoran Biennial. The selection was significant in that the jurors chose paintings that were broadly representative of art in America, including works by traditionalists as well as moderns, artists with established reputations as well as lesser-known ones. In 1935 and again in 1937 Branson showed with the New York Society of Women Artists which was considered to provide a radical alternative for women who were dissatisfied with the relatively conservative National Association of Women Painters and Sculptors. In 1938 she showed paintings in an exhibition held by a Depression-era work relief organization, New York's Municipal Art Committee. Later that year one of her paintings, "Forms," was selected to illustrate the catalog for that year's Society of Independent Artists exhibition. In 1938 and again in 1940 Branson showed in a group exhibition staged by Contemporary Arts called "Small Paintings for the Home."

Artistic style and critical reception

Branson's style varied over the course of her career. Her first paintings were meticulous copies of Classical Persian and Indian art in the Metropolitan Museum of Art. This form of self-instruction followed advice from two instructors at Columbia's Teachers College who were also members of the Society of Independent Artists, Arthur Wesley Dow and Charles Martin. She later said that Martin helped her to develop the confidence needed to apply the skills this copying gave her as she developed the abstract style of her mature art. Other painters who gave her informal instruction were  A. S. Baylinson and Kenneth Hayes Miller. Some of her paintings were pure abstractions and many had discernible subjects, whether figures or objects in nature. Some had cubist elements, others surrealist, but the dominant theme was the deployment of color forms to convey emotion. In 1935 the introductory statement to an art exhibition catalog maintained that she was "working in purely abstract forms in which she feels she can best convey her joy in color. She believes that all the depth of emotion that can be experienced thru sound, can also be experienced thru color." Branson's painting, "Dawn" (at left), illustrates her purely abstract style. The seascape, "C. P. Dey" (at right), shows a treatment of objects in nature. Her self-portrait (at left), illustrates Branson's handling of figures. Her painting, "Dancing Rhythm" (at right) illustrates Branson's use of color to convey emotion.

Personal life and family

Born on December 11, 1891, Branson was the daughter of Eugene Cunningham Branson (1861–1933), a teacher and school administrator, and his wife Lottie Lanier Smith (1868–1940). She had three siblings, Frank Lanier Branson (1889–1977), Philip Lanier Branson (1895–1988), and Elizabeth Lanier Branson (19031980. She graduated from high school but did not attend college. In 1914 she married Young Berryman Smith. The couple were married in Chapel Hill and initially lived in Atlanta where Smith was an attorney with a local law firm. A Georgia native, he had been educated at the University of Georgia and Columbia Law School. In 1915, when he joined the law faculty at Columbia, they moved to Manhattan. By 1919 Smith was a full professor and in 1930 he became the school's Dean, a position he retained until 1952. Smith served on an Armed Forces committee to prepare a plan for giving military personnel educational opportunities at the close of World War II and was chairman of the New York State Law Revision Commission in 1947. The couple had one child, a son named Charles Branson Smith (1919-2003).

Branson died on March 29, 1976, in Chapel Hill, North Carolina, and was buried in the Old Chapel Hill Cemetery.

Notes

References

1891 births
1976 deaths
Artists from Georgia (U.S. state)
Abstract painters
20th-century American painters
American women painters
20th-century American women artists
American abstract artists